Grundy's Wonders is a Tyne Tees Television architecture programme presented by John Grundy, which began in 2000.

On the programme, Grundy explores buildings in north-east England, as well as Cumbria and Yorkshire. Each programme has a particular theme or type of building, and Grundy names his favourite piece of architecture (on the week's theme) his "Grundy's Wonder", and gives a "Big Boot" to things he dislikes.

Grundy presents the programme in an enthusiastic way, while covering many aspects of the northern English region's history; this is also one of few architecture series on television.

Episodes and places visited

Series 5
Episode 1: "Rock" (26 October 2004)Featured the North Bar gateway, Beverley; Burton Agnes Hall; River Glen bridge at Ewart (near Wooler), Northumberland; Swarland Brickworks library (betw. Rothbury and Alnwick), Beamish tram shelter."Great Boot of History": BHS store, Northumberland Street, Newcastle."Grundy's Wonder": Houses near Crossgate Peth, Durham, with view to Durham Cathedral.
Episode 3: "Graffiti" (9 November 2004)Featured St Paul's Church, Jarrow; Falstow (near Kielder), Northumberland; Hexham Abbey; Berwick Town Hall prison."Great Boot of History": Jesmond Metro station."Grundy's Wonder": Prison cells, Carlisle Castle; Carlisle Cathedral.

Series 6
Programme 1: "Rock" (15 September 2005)Featured Bamburgh Castle; Bamburgh House; Steel Rigg (Hadrian's Wall); Beverley Minster."Big Boot": Rock cut architecture.
Programme 2: "Weather" (6 October 2005)Featured Swaledale, North Yorkshire; Ryedale Folk Museum, Hutton-le-Hole; Nunnykirk Hall, Muker; Joicey Road Open-Air School; Cassop, Co. Durham."Big Boot": Badly-designed classrooms."Wonder": Devonshire Building, Newcastle University.
Programme 3: "Lead" (13 October 2005)Featured Killhope (former Park Level Mine), Co. Durham; Holmes Linn, Sinderhope, Northumberland; Stublick Chimney, Langley, Northumberland; Allenheads (former colliery); Ireshopeburn (Weardale Museum)."Big Boot": Slag heaps."Wonder": Spar boxes , Weardale.
Programme 4: "Listed" (20 October 2005)About listed buildings.Featured Ripon Cathedral, Ripon, North Yorks.; Surviving Medieval buildings, Quayside, Newcastle; Newcastle Castle Keep; St Bartholomew's Church, Whittingham, Northumberland."Big Boot": Trinity Centre Multi-Storey Car Park, Gateshead.
Programme 5: "Iron Town" (27 October 2005)Grundy pointed out reminders of the rural past in the industrialised Teesside.Marton, Ormesby Hall, Kirkleatham, Acklam Hall, Eston."Big Boot": A66 road."Wonder": Middlesbrough.
Programme 6: "Monuments" (8 November 2005)Jesmond Old Cemetery; St Mary's Church, South Dalton, East Riding of Yorkshire; Sykes Sledmere Monument, Garton on the Wolds (near Sledmere), East Riding; Sledmere Eleanor Cross and Waggoner's Memorial, Sledmere; Grey's Monument, Newcastle; Angel of the North, Gateshead; The Spirit of South Tyneside, South Shields."Wonder": Conversation Piece by Juan Muñoz, South Tyneside.

References

External links
Grundy's Wonders, BFI

2000 British television series debuts
2005 British television series endings
Architecture in the United Kingdom
Historical television series
Television series by ITV Studios